Crown Court is a British television courtroom drama series produced by Granada Television for the ITV network. It ran from 1972, when the Crown Court system replaced Assize courts and Quarter sessions in the legal system of England and Wales, to 1984. It was transmitted in the early afternoon.

Format

A court case in the crown court of the fictional town of Fulchester (a name later adopted by Viz) would typically be played out over three afternoons in 25-minute episodes. The most frequent format was for the prosecution case to be presented in the first two episodes and the defence in the third, although there were some later, brief variations.

Unlike some other legal dramas, the cases in Crown Court were presented from a relatively neutral point of view and the action was confined to the courtroom itself, with occasional brief glimpses of waiting areas outside the courtroom. Although those involved in the case were actors, the jury was made up of members of the general public from the immediate Granada Television franchise area taken from the electoral register and eligible for real jury service: it was this jury alone, which decided the verdict. Indeed, contemporary production publicity stated that, for almost all of the scripts, two endings were written and rehearsed to cope with the jury's independent decision, which was delivered for the first time, as in a real court case, while the programme's recording progressed. However, the course of some cases would lead to the jury being directed to return 'not guilty' verdicts.

After an unscreened pilot (see 'Untransmitted stories' below), the first story to be shown was Lieberman v Savage (18 to 20 October 1972). Unusually this was a civil case, whereas the vast majority of subsequent instalments featured criminal trials, with only occasional civil cases such as libel, insurance or copyright claims.

Variations

There were some subtle changes in presentation in the early years. In the first year or so stories often opened with photographs of key figures or incidents around the alleged offence over which the court reporter would narrate the background to the case. In other instances there were filmed sequences but these were without dialogue and rarely showed the alleged offence. They were phased out a little earlier than the photos. Thereafter the action would immediately start in the courtroom.

Although the standard format was stories of three 25-minute episodes there were occasional variations. In 1973 there was one story of just one episode and another comprising two. In July and August 1975 a number of stories were presented in single extended episodes at 8.15pm on Saturdays—a prime time scheduling. They occupied a slot of 75 minutes (just over one hour for the story on-screen after adverts are taken into account). This was a brief interlude and the programme reverted to its standard format and daytime location thereafter.

The series was occasionally humorous and was even capable of self-parody. On 27 December 1973 a 52-minute self-contained episode Murder Most Foul had a distinctly light-hearted theme and even featured special Christmas-style titles and music. The 1977 story An Upward Fall, written by absurdist playwright N. F. Simpson, was played as a comedy. This bizarre case featured an old people's home built atop a 3,000-foot cliff; its only lavatories were located at the foot of the cliff. Other stories were deadly serious, such as the story Treason in which a White Congolese man is found guilty by the jury and sentenced to death for treason by the court (a crime formally still punishable by execution under British law at that time).

Untransmitted stories

An untransmitted pilot called Doctor's Neglect? was eventually broadcast as part of a repeat run on satellite channel Legal TV over 30 years later, and again on Talking Pictures TV commencing Monday 9th January 2023. Like the first transmitted episode, this was a civil case—in this instance relating to negligence. The pilot story differs in style in some important respects. In particular, it features informal conversations between the barristers in their quarters as well as them giving advice to clients. Neither aspect figured in episodes from the broadcast run itself, which strictly confined legal discussions to the courtroom. The episode also has no jury; the case is decided by a judge alone. David Ashford, a regular in the programme's early stages as barrister Charles Lotterby, plays a different barrister called Derek Jones. Actors Ernest Hare and David Neal make their only appearances, as a judge and barrister respectively.

This was not the only example of untransmitted stories. In February 1974 the scheduled Traffic Warden's Daughter was replaced by The Getaway. In 1979 Heart To Heart, intended for transmission from 15 to 17 April, was replaced by a repeat of A Ladies' Man (originally broadcast 15–17 February 1977).  Although neither story was ever broadcast on terrestrial TV they both received airings on Legal TV and have since been released on DVD.

Contributors

Regular actors included William Mervyn, John Barron, John Horsley, Edward Jewesbury, Richard Warner, Richard Caldicot, Basil Dignam, Laurence Hardy, Frank Middlemass, and Basil Henson as judges, John Alkin, David Ashford, Keith Barron, Jonathan Elsom, Bernard Gallagher, Peter Jeffrey, Charles Keating, Maureen Lipman, T. P. McKenna, Dorothy Vernon, Richard Wilson, William Simons and Robert Stephens were among the most common faces as barristers.

Other (then or subsequently) famous names to appear on the show included Eleanor Bron, Peter Capaldi, Warren Clarke, Tom Conti, Brian Cox, Honey Bane, Philip Bond, Liz Dawn, Michael Elphick, Sheila Fearn, Colin Firth, Gregor Fisher, Brenda Fricker, Derek Griffiths, Nigel Havers, Ian Hendry, Bernard Hill, Ben Kingsley, John Le Mesurier, Ian Marter, Mark McManus, Vivien Merchant, Mary Miller, Geraldine Newman, Judy Parfitt, Robert Powell, Peter Sallis, Anthony Sharp, Michael Sheard, Barbara Shelley, Juliet Stevenson, Patrick Troughton, Mary Wimbush and Mark Wing-Davey.

Writers included Ian Curteis, David Fisher, Peter Wildeblood, John Godber, Ngaio Marsh and Jeremy Sandford.

Recurring characters

 Peter Wheeler as Narrator/Court Reporter
 David Ashford as Charles Lotterby
 William Mervyn as The Hon. Mr. Justice Campbell
 Dorothy Vernon as Helen Tate
 Bernard Gallagher as Jonathan Fry QC
 John Alkin as Barrister Barry Deeley
 John Barron as Mr. Justice Mitchenor
 Richard Wilson as Jeremy Parsons QC
 Charles Keating as James Elliot QC
 Edward Jewesbury as The Hon. Mr. Justice Bragge
 Jonathan Elsom as Marcus Golding QC
 Mervyn Johns as Arthur Charles Parfitt and Edward Lumsden
 Richard Warner as The Hon. Mr. Justice Waddington
 John Horsley as Justice Mowbray
 Frank Middlemass as The Hon. Mr. Justice Craig
 Basil Dignam as Mr. Justice Poynter
 Gareth Forwood as Doctor Park
 Laurence Hardy as Mr. Justice Stoddard
 Basil Henson as Justice Yearly
 T. P. McKenna as Patrick Canty QC
 Michael Elphick as Neville Griffiths QC
 Peter Jeffrey as Peter Edgar QC
 Keith Barron as Timothy Dorney
 Joseph Berry as Court Usher
 William Simons as Martin O'Connor QC

Production and archive details

 Although the (non-speaking) jury members were members of the general public, the foreman of the jury would have a small speaking role to deliver their verdict. For this reason the part of the foreman had to be played by a professional actor to stay within the rules imposed on Granada by the actors' union Equity.
 All episodes of a story would be recorded on the same day.
 The show was usually recorded in Studio Two at Granada Television; Crown Court shared the studio with University Challenge. Before Crown Court began transmission, its courtroom set was used for the court scenes in an episode of the sitcom Nearest and Dearest, A Pair of Bloomers (transmitted on 20 July 1972); indeed, actor Malcolm Hebden played a court clerk in this episode as well as in several early episodes of Crown Court.
 Originally the set was of plain, light-coloured wood panel. In the mid-'70s this was replaced with darker wood in more ornate carvings. In the '80s the courtroom incorporated marble wall panels and copious red padding on much of the furniture. The depiction of the royal arms also changed, initially having the shield fully enclosed by the Garter circlet but later having it in front.
 In an effort to make the replica courtroom appear as realistic as possible to the 'jury', each episode was recorded as 'live', with retakes kept to an absolute minimum. The cameras (which at the time of production were large and cumbersome and required an operator to be present) were placed at strategic points and largely kept static, thus reducing any possible distraction caused by production requirements.
 The jury were given only 30 minutes to reach their verdict.
 Episodes included a brief voice-over narration by Peter Wheeler at the beginning either to introduce the context of the case (for the first episode of a story) or to summarise the events of the case so far (for the later episodes of a story).
 Early episodes of the series took the case name as the episode title, e.g. Lieberman v Savage (transmitted 18–20 October 1972) and "Regina v Lord" (25–27 October 1972). After the first eight cases, a short description of the issues in the case was added to the episode titles, such as Criminal Libel: Regina v Maitland (27–29 December 1972) and A Public Mischief: Regina v Baker And Crawley (31 January – 2 February 1973). This style persisted until Regina v Marlow: Freakout (7–9 March 1973); following these episodes the case title was dropped and episode titles became purely descriptive and remained so until the show ended in 1984.
 All episodes of Crown Court exist in PAL colour as originally transmitted, including the postponed Heart to Heart.
 After the pilot "Doctor's Neglect?", the programme's opening theme was the opening bars of the Fourth Movement (Allegretto) of Sinfonietta by Leoš Janáček.
 After the pilot "Doctor's Neglect?", the closing theme tune is Distant Hills, the B-side of the 1973 UK number 1 hit by the Simon Park Orchestra, Eye Level, which was the theme tune to the Amsterdam-based detective series Van der Valk.
 Joan Hickson, later to be well known for her portrayal of Agatha Christie's Miss Marple, appeared as the defendant in a story written by another of the 'Queens of Crime', Ngaio Marsh.
 Robin Bailey and Peter Blythe played judges and barristers respectively in both Crown Court and Rumpole of the Bailey.
 Episode 64's story about a procedure on an operating table, (vide infra 'List of Episodes'), displays an on-screen title, 'Tables of the Heart'; yet, in the DVD liner story notes it's called 'Tales of the Heart'. It's also the first episode which when the on-screen title 'The Verdict' briefly appears, just before the Jury's denouement is announced, the Narrator's voiceover explains that they are real members of the public.

Repeats and commercial availability
 Legal TV and UK Satellite channel Red TV showed episodes from the series until December 2008 when Red TV rebranded itself from an entertainment channel to a music channel.
 Satellite channel Granada Plus repeated a number of episodes from series one and two in the late-1990s.
 Despite the almost full archive of broadcast quality episodes the series has never been repeated on ITV since the late 1980s.
 The story The Eleventh Commandment was included as an extra on Network DVD's 2007 release of The Sandbaggers Series 3 as it features the series' lead actor Roy Marsden.
 Similarly, the Network DVD release of The XYY Man included the Crown Court story An Evil Influence (15–17 October 1975) as an extra feature; Stephen Yardley, star of The XYY Man, plays the role of Dr Thanet.
The Network DVD release of Strangers includes the 1977 story A Place to Stay, featuring Don Henderson.
 Eight volumes of stories have been released by Network DVD. These are in production order and currently include all those broadcast from the programme's inception to July 1974. The two instalments not broadcast by ITV are also included.
 Talking Pictures TV began airing three episodes (one case) a week, beginning in Jan 2023, and starting with the pilot "Doctor's Neglect?".

List of cases

 1972-10-11 Doctor's Neglect? Simpson v Rudkin General Hospital Management Board
 1972-10-18 Lieberman v Savage
 1972-10-25 R. v Lord
 1972-11-01 R. v Bryant
 1972-11-08 Euthanasia: R. v Webb
 1972-11-15 R. v Vennings and Vennings
 1972-11-22 The Eleventh Commandment: R. v Mitchell and Clayton
 1972-11-29 A Genial Man: R. v Bolton
 1972-12-06 Espionage: R. v Terson
 1972-12-13 Conspiracy: R. v Luckhurst and Sawyer
 1972-12-20 Who is Benedetto Trovato? R. v Starkie
 1972-12-27 Criminal Libel: R. v Maitland
 1972–??-?? The Medium: R. v Purbeck
 1973-01-03 Whatever Happened to George Robins? R. v Barnes
 1973-01-10 Blackmail: R. v Brewer and Brewer
 1973-01-17 Sunset of Arms: Fitton v Pusey
 1973-01-24 Persimmons and Dishwashers: R. v Curl and Curl
 1973-01-31 A Public Mischief: R. v Baker and Crawley
 1973-02-07 Portrait of an Artist: Kingsley v Messiter
 1973-02-14 A Crime in Prison: R. v Ager and Lanigan
 1973-02-21 Infanticide or Murder? R. v Collins
 1973-02-28 Act of Vengeance: R. v Collings
 1973-03-07 Freak-Out: R. v Marlow
 1973-03-14 The Mugging of Arthur Simmons: R. v Dempsey and Langham
 1973-03-21 Love Thy Neighbour: R. v Thornton and Thornton
 1973-03-28 The Death of Dracula: R. v Mattson
 1973-04-04 Wise Child: R. v Lapointe
 1973-04-11 Beware of the Dog: R. v Page
 1973-04-18 Theft by Necessity: R. v Burton
 1973-04-19 The Gilded Cage: R. v Scard
 1973-04-25 Credibility Gap: Stevens v Porton
 1973-05-02 The Long Haired Leftie: R. v Dowd
 1973-05-09 Intent to Kill: R. v Duffy
 1973-05-16 There Was a Little Girl: R. v Grey
 1973-05-23 A View to Matrimony: R. v McNeill
 1973-05-30 Settling a Score: R. v Bates
 1973-06-06 To Catch a Thief: R. v Halsey
 1973-06-13 Patch's Patch: R. v Patch
 1973-06-20 Who Was Kate Greer? R. v Archer
 1973-06-27 A Right to Life: Abbs v Richards
 1973-07-04 The Inner Circle: Heywood v Blower
 1973-07-11 The Black Poplar: R. v Tressman
 1973-07-18 The Open Invitation: R. v Sellars
 1973-07-25 Beggar on Horseback: R. v Erringburn
 1973-08-01 The Night for Country Dancing: R. v Airey
 1973-08-08 Mrs. Moresbys Scrapbook: R. v Moresby
 1973-08-15 My Old Mans a Dustman: R. v Cousins and Cousins and Mayes
 1973-08-22 The Judgement of Solomon: R. v Kamuny and Kamuny
 1973-08-29 Destruct, Destruct ... R. v Ainsworth 
 1973-09-05 Public Lives: R. v Williams and Pastor 
 1973-09-12 The Thunderbolts: Easter v Goss 
 1973-09-19 Treason: R. v Clement 
 1973-09-26 A Stab in the Front: R. v Blandford 
 1973-10-10 Just Good Friends: R. v Beaumont
 1973-10-17 To Suffer a Witch: R. v Vincent 
 1973-10-24 Hit and Miss: R. v Burnett 
 1973-10-31 No Spoiling: R. v Smithson 
 1973-11-07 The Age of Leo Trotsky: R. v Smith 
 1973-11-14 Robin and his Juliet: R. v Tomlin 
 1973-11-21 The Most Expensive Steak in the World: Da Costa v McIver
 1973-11-28 Message to Ireland: R. v Parfitt
 1973-12-05 No Smoke Without Fire: R. v Bennington
 1973-12-12 Conduct Prejudicial: R. v Pardoe
 1973-12-19 Tables (sic, vide supra in 'Production Details') of the Heart: R. v Saul 
 1973-12-27 Murder Most Foul: R. v Hammond
 1974-01-02 The Dogs: R. v Broad
 1974-01-09 Further Charges: R. v Elgar
 1974-01-16 Hidden Scars: R. v Fowkes
 1974-01-23 With Menaces: R. v Aslam
 1974-01-30 Do Your Worst: R. v Skelhorne, McIver and Appleton
 1974-02-06 Flight of the Lapwing: Cummings v Simon
 1974-02-13 Traffic Warden's Daughter: R. v Lianos
 1974-02-13 The Getaway: R. v McDowell
 1974-02-20 The Woman Least Likely ... R. v Rutland
 1974-02-27 A Case of Murder: R. v Povey
 1974-03-06 The Assault on Choga Sar: Wainwright v Bowman
 1974-03-13 Duress: R. v Mallard
 1974-03-20 30,000 Pieces of Silver: Porter v Porter
 1974-03-27 Nuts: R. v Holloway
 1974-04-03 Confine to Solitary: R. v Hogarth
 1974-04-10 Big Annie: Robertson v Ash
 1974-04-17 Falling Stars: Leigh v Glynn
 1974-04-24 Son and Heir: R. v Carvell
 1974-05-01 Death in the Family: R. v Durrant
 1974-05-08 Minnie: R. v Barlow
 1974-05-15 Vermin: R. v Brimmer
 1974-05-22 South Tower:  R. v Carney
 1974-05-29 Triangle: R. v Prosser and Jackson
 1974-06-05 Victims of Prejudice: R. v Clark and Hamilton
 1974-06-12 Baby Farm: R. v Francis
 1974-06-19 For the Good of the Many: R. v Cardy
 1974-06-26 How to Rob a Memory Bank: R. v Warren
 1974-07-03 The Wreck of the Tedmar: R. v Blaney
 1974-07-10 Two Rings for Margie: R. v Middleton
 1974-07-17 No Stranger in Court: R. v Clegg
 1974-07-24 Security Risk: R. v Denton
 1974-07-31 The Probationer: R. v Cresswell
 1974-08-07 Midnight with No Pain
 1974-08-14 Not Dead But Gone Before
 1974-08-21 Corruption
 1974-08-28 Pickets
 1974-09-04 The Dogs Next Door
 1974-09-11 Good and Faithful Friends
 1974-09-18 Strange Past
 1974-09-25 On Impulse
 1974-10-02 Double, Double
 1974-10-09 The Hunt
 1974-10-16 The Messenger Boy
 1974-10-23 The Dashing Young Officer
 1974-10-30 Immoral Earnings
 1974-11-06 Winklers
 1974-11-13 The Alb of St. Honoratus
 1974-11-20 Cover Up
 1974-11-27 Beloved Alien
 1974-12-04 Arson
 1974-12-11 Forgive-Me-Not
 1974-12-18 Pot of Basil
 1975-01-02 Ring in the New Year
 1975-01-08 The Quest
 1975-01-15 A Difference in Style
 1975-01-22 Matron
 1975-01-29 The Personator
 1975-02-05 Two in the Mind of One
 1975-02-12 The Murder Monitor
 1975-02-19 Who Cares?
 1975-02-26 Saboteur
 1975-03-05 The Trees
 1975-03-12 Bad Day at Black Cape
 1975-03-19 The Mad, Mad Man
 1975-03-26 Contempt of Court
 1975-04-02 Possessed
 1975-04-09 The Also Ran
 1975-04-16 Take Back Your Mink
 1975-04-16 Dead Drunk
 1975-04-30 Light the Blue Touch-Paper
 1975-05-07 The Healing Hand
 1975-05-14 The Obsession
 1975-05-21 My Mother Said I Never Should ...
 1975-07-19 Who Killed Cock Robin?
 1975-07-26 Songbirds Out of Tune
 1975-08-02 Inner City Blues
 1975-08-09 Marathon
 1975-08-16 The Natural Bond
 1975-08-23 Evil Liver
 1975-10-15 An Evil Influence
 1975-10-22 Never on Saturdays, Never on Sundays
 1975-10-29 Will the Real Robert Randell Please Stand Up
 1975-11-05 Hunger Strike
 1975-11-12 An Englishman's Home
 1975-11-19 Blood Is Thicker
 1975-11-26 The Party's Over
 1975-12-03 The Extremist
 1975-12-10 Mother Love
 1975-12-17 Dicing
 1975-12-31 Humpty Dumpty Sat on the Wall
 1976-01-07 Crime and Passion
 1976-01-14 ... Or Was He Pushed?
 1976-01-21 No Questions Asked
 1976-01-28 The Right of Every Woman
 1976-02-04 Beyond the Call of Duty
 1976-02-11 To Love, Cherish – and Batter
 1976-02-18 Scard
 1976-02-25 Tell the Truth and Shame the Devil
 1976-03-03 The Ju-Ju Landlord
 1976-03-10 Ends and Means
 1976-03-17 Incorrigible Rogue
 1976-03-30 Drunk, Who Cares
 1976-04-06 Accepted Standards
 1976-04-13 The Jolly Swagmen
 1976-05-04 A Bang or a Whimper
 1976-05-19 Pigmented Patter
 1976-10-06 Stranger in the Night
 1976-10-13 Those in Peril
 1976-10-20 A Working Girl
 1976-10-27 A Matter of Honour
 1976-11-03 Inside Story
 1976-11-10 Death for Sale
 1976-11-17 Treewomen of Jagden Crag
 1976-11-24 You Won't Escape When Hendrik Witbooi Comes
 1976-12-01 Operation Happiness
 1976-12-08 Lola
 1976-12-15 Royalties
 1976-12-22 A World of Difference
 1976-12-29 Auld Lang Syne
 1977-01-04 Beauty and the Beast
 1977-01-25 Home Sweet Home
 1977-02-01 Loved Ones
 1977-02-08 We Are the Champions
 1977-02-15 A Ladies' Man
 1977-02-22 A Matter of Faith
 1977-03-01 Crime Passionel
 1977-03-08 A Swinging Couple
 1977-03-15 One for the Road
 1977-03-22 Such a Charming Man
 1977-03-29 A Sheep in Wolf's Clothing
 1977-04-05 The Family Business
 1977-10-18 A Pocketful of Pills
 1977-10-25 Capers Among the Catacombs
 1977-11-01 Kiss and Tell
 1977-11-08 Down Will Come Baby
 1977-11-15 The Silencer
 1977-11-22 Home
 1977-11-29 A Place to Stay
 1977-12-06 Safe as Houses
 1977-12-13 Street Gang
 1977-12-20 An Upward Fall: Cosmic Planning Consultants v Rosenberg Research Foundation
 1978-01-03 Black and Blue
 1978-01-10 Meeting Place
 1978-01-17 Echoes
 1978-01-24 White Lies
 1978-01-31 The Song Not the Singer
 1978-02-07 Michael
 1978-02-14 Association
 1978-02-21 Still Life with Feathers
 1978-02-28 Cat in Hell
 1978-03-07 To Catch a Thief
 1978-03-14 The Change
 1978-03-21 The Jawbone of an Ass
 1978-03-28 Two Thousand Witnesses
 1978-04-04 Code
 1978-04-11 Common Sense
 1978-09-05 In the Heat of the Moment
 1978-09-12 Does Your Mother Know You're Out?
 1978-09-19 The Crown of Life
 1978-09-26 Past Times
 1978-10-03 Queen Bee
 1978-10-10 The Green House Girls
 1978-10-17 Through the Bottom of a Glass Darkly
 1978-10-24 Still Waters
 1978-10-31 A Man with Everything
 1978-11-07 Scalped
 1978-11-14 Soft Target
 1979-01-02 Somebody
 1979-01-09 Beyond the Limits
 1979-01-16 Sugar and Spice
 1979-01-23 Hospital Roulette
 1979-01-30 A Friend of the Family
 1979-02-06 Baby Love
 1979-02-13 Honour Thy Father and Thy Mother
 1979-02-20 My Brother's Son
 1979-02-27 Cash
 1979-03-06 Boys Will Be Boys
 1979-03-13 The Deep End
 1979-03-20 Rebel at Law
 1979-03-27 A Hunting We Will Go
 1979-04-03 Question of Care
 1979-04-10 Cowboy
 1979-05-01 Forever
 1979-05-08 The Irish Connection
 1979-05-15 Heart to Heart
 1979-05-22 Betrayal of Trust
 1979-12-27 Caroline
 1980-08-26 Public Spending
 1981-03-09 Proof Spirits
 1981-03-16 Foul Play
 1981-03-23 Freedom to Incite
 1981-03-30 Hen Party
 1981-04-06 Leonora
 1981-04-13 Embers
 1981-04-21 The Merry Widow
 1981-05-04 Cold Turkey
 1982-03-23 Talking to the Enemy
 1982-03-30 Resurrection Woman
 1982-04-06 Ignorance in the Field
 1982-04-13 On the Defensive
 1982-04-20 Fair Play
 1982-04-27 Peanuts
 1982-05-04 Face Value
 1982-05-11 Wrecker
 1982-05-18 Window Shopping
 1982-05-25 Soldier, Soldier
 1982-06-01 Too Bad for Tobias
 1982-06-08 A Candidate for the Alliance
 1982-06-15 The Fiddling Connection
 1983-01-04 Brainwashed
 1983-01-11 Seconds Away
 1983-01-18 None of Your Business
 1983-01-25 Night Fever
 1983-02-01 A Black and White Case
 1983-02-08 Personal Credit
 1983-02-15 Fighting Fire with Fire
 1983-02-22 A Proper Man
 1983-03-08 Told in Silence
 1983-03-15 Mother's Boy
 1983-03-22 Living in Sin?
 1983-03-29 A Matter of Trust
 1983-04-05 A Sword in the Hand of David
 1984-01-03 Gingerbread Girl
 1984-01-10 Oddball
 1984-01-17 The Son of His Father
 1984-01-24 Whisper Who Dares
 1984-01-31 Citizens
 1984-02-01 Dirty Washing
 1984-02-13 Her Father's Daughter
 1984-02-21 There Was an Old Woman
 1984-02-28 Burnt Futures
 1984-03-06 Mother Figures
 1984-03-13 Big Deal
 1984-03-20 Love and War
 1984-03-27 Paki Basher

References and footnotes

External links
Water Cooler Moments – Crown Court
Screenonline – Crown Court:(1972-1984)

1970s British drama television series
1980s British drama television series
1970s British crime television series
1980s British crime television series
1970s British legal television series
1980s British legal television series
1972 British television series debuts
1984 British television series endings
ITV television dramas
Television series by ITV Studios
Television shows produced by Granada Television
English-language television shows
Dramatized court shows
Courtroom drama television series